Chenguttai is a village which is a part of Vellore municipality, Tamil Nadu, India. It is located very closely to the Katpadi Railway station. There are about six temples in the village.

Villages in Vellore district